Tank District is a district in Dera Ismail Khan Division of Khyber Pakhtunkhwa province in Pakistan. The city of Tank is the capital of the district, which consists of Union Council City I and Union Council City II. There are sixteen Union councils of district Tank. Until 1992 Tank was a tehsil within Dera Ismail Khan District. Tank is bounded by the districts of Lakki Marwat to the northeast, Dera Ismail Khan to the east and southeast, FR Tank to the north and the South Waziristan Agency to the west. The climate in Tank reaches 110–120 °F. However, in the cold, harsh winters in the mountains to the west, people come to Tank to enjoy a pleasant stay and then return during the summer.

History

Macedonian flight 
At the Battle of the Hydaspes (now the Beas River), fought between Alexander the Great's army and the Indian king Purushotthama (better known as Porus), the Macedonian army refused to go any further. It is said that Alexander's army's was at risk of being trapped, or was faced by an enemy army too big to defeat, and had to retreat southwards through the Makran Desert.

Arrival of Islam

The Islam came in the Tank region in eighth century A.D. when Umayyad general Muhammad Bin Qasim had attacked on the Multan and nearby areas. The tribe known as Arain in Tank District is the generation of those Arab soldiers who came towards Multan with Muhammad Bin Qasim.

Modern history 
Finally, the Sikhs from the south overran the local tribes. They annexed the land in 1838. Somewhere in the midst of this turmoil, the British were assembling against the Pashtuns and the First British-Afghan War commenced. The British took over in 1848. The British regiments weren't able to occupy the entire territory and remained in camps at the foothills of the mountains, while the harsh and dangerous upland terrain remained unexplored.
 "...even the shadows of the hills were hazardous."
The eastern border of the Kingdom of Kabul was undefined until 1893 when the Durand Line was demarcated. At that moment, the line was used to intentionally separate the fierce Pushtun tribes from the tame. Under the same agreement, the tribes of Waziristan were clearly designated as being under the British rule.

The British negotiated with the tribes through their agents in the border towns and Tank was a centre of negotiation with the Mahsud tribe – For the Britishers the Mahsud tribe was the most difficult to control, and in 1860 when the Mullah Shaleem kaka machi khel Mahsuds lushker attacked the British with a 3000 strong army the British were forced to penetrate into the territory of Tank to control them.

In January 1899, Lord Curzon was appointed Viceroy of India. Reaching India shortly after the suppression of the frontier risings of 1897–98, he paid special attention to the independent tribes of the north-west frontier and inaugurated a new province called the North-West Frontier Province (now Khyber Pakhtunkhwa), and pursued a policy of forceful control mingled with conciliation. The only major armed outbreak on this frontier during the period of his administration was the Mahsud Waziri campaign of 1901.

Post-independence 
After Independence Tank district became part of Pakistan. In 2018 the Frontier Region Tank was formally merged with Tank district.

Administration
The district contains two Tehsils - Tank and Jandola. And is represented in the Provincial Assembly by one elected MPA, who represents the PF-69 (Tank-1) constituency.

Tehsils
 Tank Tehsil
 Jandola Tehsil  (formerly Frontier Region Tank)

Demographics

At the time of the 2017 census the district had a population of 427,044, of which 218,883 were males and 208,131 females. Rural population was 379,980 (88.98%) while the urban population was 47,064 (11.02%). The literacy rate was 40.98% - the male literacy rate was 59.98% while the female literacy rate was 21.35%. 503 people in the district were from religious minorities.

At the time of the 2017 census, 81.87% of the population spoke Pashto and 16.05% Saraiki as their first language.

People make their livelihood by farming, smuggling, falcon catching, migration for employment to the Persian Gulf, or by ownership of shops and businesses in Tank.

"Jirga" means council. These are the religious circles and a group of people that decide the fate of the dwellers and rule the people by their sets of laws and principles.

Tourism

Shrines 
The Shrine of Pir Sabir Shah Baba is one of the most visited places in the city. A number of devotees from the city and adjacent districts including Bannu, Lakki and Dera Ismail Khan visiting this Shrine. The three-day Urs of Pir Sabir Shah Baba annually organized from June 2 to June 5. Earlier, the Urs was considered to be one of the big festival of the city and a large number of people attending the Urs. The Shrine Custodian still distribute foods among people visiting the Shrine and Halwa (Traditional Sweet) given on every Wednesday. Socond popular Shrine is Mama Pir Ziarat which is located near Umar Adda and a number of devotees visiting the Shrine of Mama Pir. The Urs of Mama Pir also organized annually.

Nawab Qilla 
Nawab Qilla is a mud fort built most probably by Nawab Katal Khan with views over an area of more than two hundred Kanals of land. The Qilla is situated at one corner of Tank city and that is the imaginary line-dividing Tank in to upper and lower part. The mud walls are several feet high approximately equal to a modern-day three-story building. Huge trunks of trees can be seen poking out from the walls of Qilla. These were used to give strength and stability to the mud walls. There were four huge Burgs at each corner of the Qilla with several intervening pickets at regular distance all around. The four main burgs were used as an entrance for armed men who could move around and reach guard posts from within the Qilla without being seen from outside. The Qilla had three gigantic gates. The diameter or thickness of the wall from the top was initially equal to so that a Tanga (Horse Cart) could easily move over it. The residence of NAWAB Sohib was in the center of Qilla.

Nawab of Tank Garden 
The Nawab Bagh was situated at the back of Nawab Qilla, spread over an area of more than five hundred Kanals of land.
This bagh was well looked after before, during Nawab Qasim Khan time and perhaps in the early days of Qutbuddin Khan. 
Nawab Qutbuddin Khan had kept large herd of buffalos, cows and it was not unusual to see a herd of two hundred or more buffalos, cows moving toward Nawab Qilla every day. Nawab bagh as said before even in the sixties was deserted, has now completely disappeared as the land was sold by Qutbuddin s’ sons and a housing colony named Qutub colony has been constructed over its place right up to city police station and Pir Sabir Shah mausoleum.

See also
Federally Administered Tribal Areas
Kakka Khel
Khwajikhel
Kot Allah Dad

References

External links
Durand Line re-demarcation
http://www.maplandia.com/pakistan/n-w-f-p/dera-ismail-khan/mullazai/

 
Districts of Khyber Pakhtunkhwa

pt:Tank (Paquistão)
simple:Tank (Pakistan)
ur:ٹانک